Actinodaphne bourneae is a species of plant in the family Lauraceae. It is endemic to Tamil Nadu in India. It is threatened by habitat loss.

References

bourneae
Flora of Tamil Nadu
Endangered plants
Taxonomy articles created by Polbot